Euro First Air - Canarias Cargo, also known as EFA - Canarias Cargo or simply Canarias Cargo, was an airline based in Las Palmas, Canary Islands, Spain.

History
Euro First Air - Canarias Cargo was founded on 30 November 1999 with headquarters in Las Palmas. The airline projected to establish itself first as a cargo airline between Spain and the US, and later to expand in order to include passenger services as well.

It began operating charter cargo services from its base at Gran Canaria Airport using a single Airbus A300 aircraft.

Owing to financial difficulties EFA - Canarias Cargo ceased all operations the following year. Creditors and unpaid employees filed lawsuits against the airline even after it ceased operating.

Code data
ICAO Code: EFA (not current)

Fleet
1 Airbus A300B4-203

References

External links

Airline history; Spain
Airliners - Picture of the Airbus A300B4-203(F) aircraft
ATLANTIC AIRWAYS S.A., a company related to Euro First Air S.A.

Airlines established in 1999
Airlines disestablished in 2000
Defunct airlines of Spain
Transport in the Canary Islands
Cargo airlines
1999 establishments in Spain